The Metropolitan and Great Central Joint Railway was a joint railway company that controlled a line extending from Harrow on the Hill in what is now north-western Greater London to Verney Junction in Buckinghamshire, England. Owned by the Metropolitan Railway and the Great Central Railway, the railway was nationalised in 1948.

History

On 2 April 1906, the same day that the Great Western and Great Central Joint Railway (GWGCJR) was opened, the Metropolitan and Great Central Joint Railway (MGCJR) was created. The MGCJR was created under the terms of the Metropolitan & Great Central Railway Act, which received Royal Assent on 4 August 1905.

Management of the joint line was to be in alternate periods of five years by the two co-owners, the first five-year term being that of the Metropolitan. Aylesbury station was leased jointly to the MGCJR and the GWGCJR from 1907.

Purchase of land began in 1914, but the First World War held up further progress, and the first contract for construction was not placed until December 1922.

At the start of 1923, the GCR was a constituent of the newly created London and North Eastern Railway; and on 1 July 1933, the Metropolitan was a constituent of the London Passenger Transport Board. Through both these changes of ownership, the MGCJR retained its title, and was listed in the Transport Act 1947, which nationalised the British railways, as one of the "bodies whose undertakings are transferred to the [British Transport] Commission".

In 1993, British Rail (now Chiltern Railways) services calling at Moor Park ceased.

Legacy
The route north of Aylesbury was closed to passenger trains in September 1966.

Notes

References

 

Great Central Railway
Metropolitan Railway
Railway companies established in 1906
British joint railway companies
British companies established in 1906